Sarfo Gyamfi (born 17 July 1967) is a former Ghanaian international footballer. He was part of the squad that participated at the 1992 Africa Cup of Nations where Ghana reached the final.

He has played professional football in Ghana, Nigeria and Europe. He is known as "The Black President" by Asante Kotoko fans. He retired from playing in 1998.

References

External links 
 
 
 

1967 births
Living people
Ghanaian footballers
Asante Kotoko S.C. players
FC Admira Wacker Mödling players
1. FC Lokomotive Leipzig players
Hallescher FC players
Austrian Football Bundesliga players
2. Bundesliga players
1992 African Cup of Nations players
Ghana international footballers
African Games gold medalists for Ghana
African Games medalists in football
Association football midfielders
Competitors at the 2011 All-Africa Games